Sachindra Nath Sanyal  (3 April 1890 — 7 February 1942) was an Indian revolutionary and co-founder of the Hindustan Republican Army (HRA, which after 1928 became the Hindustan Socialist Republican Association) that was created to carry out armed resistance against the British Empire in India. He was a mentor for revolutionaries like Chandra Shekhar Azad, Jatindra Nath Das, and Bhagat Singh.

Early life
Sachindra Nath Sanyal's parents were Bengali Brahmins. His father was Hari Nath Sanyal and his mother was Kherod Vasini Devi. He was born in Benaras, then in United Provinces, on 3 April 1890 and married Pratibha Sanyal, with whom he had one son.

Revolutionary career
Sanyal founded a branch of the Anushilan Samiti in Patna in 1913. In 1912 Delhi Conspiracy Trial Sanyal with Rashbehari Bose attacked the then Viceroy Hardinge while he was making entry into new capital of Delhi after annulment of Bengal Partition. Hardinge was injured And lady Hardinge died at the attack.

He was extensively involved in the plans for the Ghadar conspiracy, and went underground after it was exposed in February 1915. He was a close associate of Rash Behari Bose. After Bose escaped to Japan, Sanyal was considered the most senior leader of India's revolutionary movement.

Sanyal was sentenced to life - term imprisonment for his involvement in the conspiracy and was imprisoned at Cellular Jail in the Andaman and Nicobar Islands, where he wrote his book titled Bandi Jeevan (A Life of Captivity, 1922). He was briefly released from jail but when he continued to engage in anti-British activities, he was sent back and his ancestral family home in Benaras was confiscated.

Following the end of the Non-cooperation movement in 1922, Sanyal, Ram Prasad Bismil and some other revolutionaries who wanted an independent India and were prepared to use force to achieve their goal, founded the Hindustan Republican Association in October 1924. He was the author of the HRA manifesto, titled The Revolutionary, that was distributed in large cities of North India on 1 January 1925.

Sanyal was jailed for his involvement in the Kakori conspiracy but was among those conspirators released from Naini Central Prison in August 1937. Thus, Sanyal has the unique distinction of having been sent to the Cellular Jail in Port Blair twice. He contracted tuberculosis in jail and was sent to Gorakhpur Jail for his final months. He died on 7 February 1942.

Beliefs
Sanyal and Mahatma Gandhi engaged in a famous debate published in Young India between 1920 and 1924. Sanyal argued against Gandhi's gradualist approach.

Sanyal was known for his firm Hindu beliefs, although most of his followers were Marxists and thus opposed to religions.  Bhagat Singh discusses Sanyal's beliefs in his tract Why I am an Atheist. Jogesh Chandra Chatterjee was a close associate of Sanyal. He was also supplied with guns by Maulana Shaukat Ali, who was at that time a supporter of Congress and its non-violent methods but not with the same fervor for non-violence that was expressed by his organization's leader, Gandhi. Another prominent Congressman, Krishna Kant Malaviya, also supplied him with weapons.

Death
Sanyal participated in anti-British programs, which resulted in a second prison term and government seizure of his Benares property. He died of tuberculosis while serving his second term in prison on 7 February 1942.

References

External links
 Shaheed from Varanasi

1893 births
1942 deaths
Anushilan Samiti
Hindu–German Conspiracy
Revolutionaries from Varanasi
Hindustan Socialist Republican Association
Indian people imprisoned on charges of terrorism